History Makers was a documentary film series of biographies of Canadian politicians by various directors originally produced in from 1959 to 1964 in anticipation of the Centennial of Confederation by the National Film Board and later aired on CBC Television in 1970.

Production

Seventeen episodes, depicting Canada from pre-Confederation to the 1950s, were produced by the National Film Board with each costing around $40,000 for the Canadian Centennial. Donald Creighton and Guy Frégault reviewed the historical research and scripts. Louis-Joseph Papineau: The Demi-God and Louis-Hippolyte Lafontaine were the only episodes directed by French-speakers.

Episodes

References

Works cited

External links
 
 The History Makers at the National Film Board of Canada

CBC Television original programming
1970 Canadian television series debuts
1970 Canadian television series endings
National Film Board of Canada documentary series
1970s Canadian documentary television series
Documentary television series about historical events
Biographical television series
Documentary television series about politics
1960s Canadian films